Ashley Támar Davis, known professionally as Támar Davis and sometimes simply Támar, is an American singer who came to prominence through her association with Prince. She sang the co-lead vocals on his Grammy-nominated song "Beautiful, Loved and Blessed" from his 2006 album, 3121 and on backup vocals throughout the album. She made her professional stage debut touring with Prince in 2006 at Manhattan's Nokia Theatre. Támar started her musical career in the group Girl's Tyme, appearing with them on Star Search, but left before the group was renamed Destiny's Child. In 2016, she auditioned for season 10 of the American talent competition The Voice. She was a member of Kanye West's Sunday Service Choir, and is music supervisor for That Damn Michael Che.

The Voice
Támar auditioned for season 10 of the American series The Voice. On an episode broadcast on NBC on March 8, 2016, she sang "Chain of Fools" with two of the four judges Christina Aguilera and Blake Shelton turning their chairs. She opted to continue competing as part of Team Christina.

Discography
Milk & Honey (2006) 
My Name Is Tamar (2011)
I Am the Storm (2016)
My Name Is Ashley (2021)

References

External links
 
 Biography of Támar Davis
 About Támar Davis
 Tamar's Road to Stardom
 Támar on Star Search

Year of birth missing (living people)
American child singers
American female dancers
American dancers
American rhythm and blues singer-songwriters
The Voice (franchise) contestants
Living people
Singer-songwriters from Texas
People from Houston
USC Thornton School of Music alumni
21st-century American singers
21st-century American women